Marengo was a wooden-hulled, armored frigate of the , built for the French Navy in the mid to late 1860s. The ship was running her sea trials in July 1870 when the Franco-Prussian War began and was immediately placed in reserve until after the war was over. Marengo participated in the French occupation of Tunisia in 1881 and was flagship of the Northern Squadron in 1891 when it made port visits in Britain and Russia. She was sold for scrap in 1896.

Design and description
The Océan-class ironclads were designed by Henri Dupuy de Lôme as an improved version of the s. The ships were central battery ironclads with the armament concentrated amidships. For the first time in a French ironclad three watertight iron bulkheads were fitted in the hull. Like most ironclads of their era they were equipped with a metal-reinforced ram.

Her crew numbered between 750 and 778 officers and men.

Propulsion
The Océan-class ships had one horizontal return connecting rod compound steam engine driving a single propeller. Their engines were powered by eight oval boilers. On sea trials the engine produced  and Marego reached .

Armament
These ships had their main armament mounted in four barbettes on the upper deck, one gun at each corner of the battery, with the remaining guns on the battery deck below the barbettes. Marengos armament was upgraded, before she commissioned, to four  guns in the barbettes, and on the battery deck, four  and seven  guns. By 1885 two more 274-millimeter guns had been added and all of the 138-millimeter guns were replaced by four  guns.

The guns could fire both solid shot and explosive shells.

At some point the ship received a dozen  Hotchkiss 5-barrel revolving guns. They had a rate of fire of about 30 rounds per minute. The hull was not recessed to enable any of the guns on the battery deck to fire forward or aft. However, the guns mounted in the barbettes sponsoned out over the sides of the hull did have some ability to fire fore and aft. Late in the ship's career four above-water  torpedo tubes were added.

Armor
The Ocean-class ships had a complete  wrought iron waterline belt. The unarmored portions of their sides were protected by  iron plates. Gardiner says that the barbette armor was later removed to improve their stability, but this is not confirmed by any other source.

Service
Marengo was laid down at Brest in July 1865 and launched on 15 October 1868. The ship began her sea trials on 1 July 1870 and was running them when the Franco-Prussian War of 1870–71 began. She was immediately put in reserve and not commissioned until 1872 for service with the Mediterranean Squadron. Marengo remained with the squadron until 1876 when she was again placed in reserve. On 2 October 1880 the ship was recommissioned and assigned to the Mediterranean Squadron. Marengo was transferred to the Levant Squadron on 13 February 1881 and bombarded the Tunisian port of Sfax in July as part of the French occupation of Tunisia. She remained in the Mediterranean until 1886 when she was assigned to the Reserve Squadron. In 1888 Marengo became the flagship of the Northern Squadron and led the squadron during its port visits to Osborne Bay and Spithead in August 1891 and to Kronstadt in September 1891. She was reduced to reserve the following year and sold on 7 March 1896.

Footnotes

References

External links 
  classe Océan

Ships built in France
1869 ships
Océan-class ironclads